Lay minister may refer to:

 Licensed lay minister, a lay person authorised to conduct certain services and perform other priestly duties in the Anglican church
 A lay minister in other denominations. See lay ministry and laity.